An opisthodomos (ὀπισθόδομος, 'back room') can refer to either the rear room of an ancient Greek temple or to the inner shrine, also called the adyton ('not to be entered'). The confusion arises from the lack of agreement in ancient inscriptions. In modern scholarship, it usually refers to the rear porch of a temple.  On the Athenian Acropolis especially, the opisthodomos came to be a treasury, where the revenues and precious dedications of the temple were kept.  Its use in antiquity was not standardised.  In part because of the ritual secrecy of such inner spaces, it is not known exactly what took place within opisthodomoi; it can safely be assumed that practice varied widely by place, date and particular temple.

Architecturally, the opisthodomos (as a back room) balances the pronaos or porch of a temple, creating a plan with diaxial symmetry.  The upper portion of its outer wall could be decorated with a frieze, as on the Hephaisteion and the Parthenon.

Opisthodomoi are present in the layout of:

Temples ER, A and O at Selinus
Temple of Aphaea at Aegina
Temple of Zeus at Olympia
Hephaisteion in the Agora of Athens
Parthenon on the Acropolis in Athens
Temple of Concordia, Agrigento
Temple of Poseidon on Cape Sounion
Temple of Apollo Epikourios at Bassae
Temple of Athena Lindia at Lindos
Temple of Dionysus at Teos

References 

Architectural elements
Ancient Greek architecture
Rooms